My Horrible Year! is a 2001 television movie produced for Showtime, starring Allison Mack, Caterina Scorsone, and Dan Petronijevic. The film was directed by Eric Stoltz, and includes a cameo by Bret Hart, the professional wrestler. This production was filmed in Toronto.

The film was nominated for a Daytime Emmy Award for Outstanding Directing in a Children's Special and a Young Artist Award for Best Performance in a TV Movie or Special - Supporting Young Actor.

Synopsis 
After fifteen-year-old Nik's (Mack) favorite uncle passes away, she feels like the world is about to collapse and considers suicide. In addition to dealing with typical problems such as school, bullies, wearing braces, body changes, and babysitting, she overhears a portion of a conversation between her parents, causing her to believe that her father is having an affair with her recently widowed aunt, which considerably adds to her stress. She fears that her parents are going to divorce on her sixteenth birthday.  With help from her unconventional friends, Mouse and Babyface, she attempts to save her parents' marriage.

References

External links 
 
 
 My Horrible Year! at The New York Times
 My Horrible Year! at Variety

2001 television films
2001 films
2001 comedy-drama films
2000s teen comedy-drama films
American teen comedy-drama films
Comedy-drama television films
Films directed by Eric Stoltz
Films scored by Richard Band
Films shot in Toronto
Showtime (TV network) films
American drama television films
2000s American films